Tha Yang is a district (amphoe) in the southern part of Phetchaburi province, western Thailand.

Etymology 
In 1910, the western part of the district (which now is Kaeng Krachan district) was covered by dense forest. The main trees are Makha (Monkey Pod wood, Afzelia xylocarpa), Takhian (Ironwood, Hopea odorata) and Yang (Dipterocarpus alatus). Thus when the government established the district, they named it Tha Yang (literally, 'Yang tree pier').

History
The district was originally named Yang Yong, and was renamed Tha Yang in 1939.

Geography 
Neighboring districts are (from the north clockwise) Mueang Phetchaburi, Ban Lat, Kaeng Krachan of Phetchaburi Province, Hua Hin of Prachuap Khiri Khan province, Cha-am of Phetchaburi Province and the Gulf of Thailand.

Administration 
The district is divided into 12 sub-districts (tambons), which are further subdivided into 119 villages (mubans). Tha Yang and Nong Chok are two townships (thesaban tambon): Tha Yang covers the whole tambon Tha Yang and parts of Tha Khoi, while Nong Chok covers parts of the same-named tambon. There are a further 12 tambon administrative organizations (TAO).

Missing numbers belonged to tambon which now form Kaeng Krachan District.

References

External links
amphoe.com

Tha Yang